C-8813 (thiobromadol) is a potent μ-opioid receptor agonist with a distinctive chemical structure which is not closely related to other established families of opioid drugs. The trans-isomer was found to be around 591 times more potent than morphine in animal studies. The same study assigned a potency of 504 times that of morphine to the related compound BDPC.

C-8813 is claimed to be similarly potent at the δ-opioid receptor, which antagonizes the mu depression of breathing, presumably making the drug safer.

C-8813 has never been used in humans.

See also 

 BDPC
 Ciramadol
 Faxeladol
 Profadol
 Tapentadol
 Tramadol

References 

Arylcyclohexylamines
Synthetic opioids
Thiophenes
Tertiary alcohols
Bromoarenes
Mu-opioid receptor agonists
Delta-opioid receptor agonists